The Order of Merit of the Principality of Liechtenstein is an order of merit of the Principality of Liechtenstein that is awarded for services rendered to the principality. Prince Franz I founded the Order of Merit of the Principality of Liechtenstein on 22 July 1937 (on the anniversary of his marriage).

Grades of the Order
There order is presented in six grades of two ranks of Knight and Dame, depending on the criteria of the recipient.

 Grand Cross, Special Class. (Grand star in Gold with Diamonds)
 Grand Cross, 1st Class. (Ordinary star in Gold with Diamonds)
 Grand Cross. (Ordinary Star)
 Grand Officer (Necklet or Bow with Ordinary star)
 Commander (Necklet or Bow)
 Officer (Medal with Gold Cross)
 Knight (Medal with Silver Cross)
 Medal (Medal with Bronze Cross)

Recipients 
Recipients have included:
 Hans-Adam II, Prince of Liechtenstein – Grand Star
 Alois, Hereditary Prince of Liechtenstein – Grand Star
 Franz I, Prince of Liechtenstein – Grand Star
 Franz Joseph II, Prince of Liechtenstein – Grand Star
 Princess Georgina, Princess Consort of Liechtenstein – Grand Star
 Princess Marie, Princess Consort of Liechtenstein – Grand Star
 Prince Philipp of Liechtenstein – Grand Star
 Prince Nikolaus of Liechtenstein – Grand Star 
 Josef Hoop – Grand Cross 
 Alois Mock – Grand Cross
 Karlheinz Kopf – Grand Cross with Diamonds
 Wolfgang Schüssel – Grand Cross
 Wolfgang Brandstetter – Grand Cross
 Alexander Van der Bellen – Grand Star
 Sophie, Hereditary Princess of Liechtenstein – Grand Star
 Princess Margaretha of Liechtenstein – Dame Grand Cross, 1st Class
 Markus Wallner- Grand Cross
 Alexander Schallenberg – Grand Cross

References

External links
 DÉCORATIONS du LIECHTENSTEIN (French), décorations in colour, including the plaque.
Concerning the foundation of the Order of Merit and its medal (German) – gesetze.li

1937 establishments in Liechtenstein
Orders, decorations, and medals of Liechtenstein
Merit of the Principality of Liechtenstein, Order of the
Orders of merit
Awards established in 1937